Jū (鞠 or 居; also a variant of Zhu) is a Chinese family name.

Notable people

鞠
 Ju Ping (鞠萍), a host
 Ju Yingzhi (鞠盈智), a footballer
 Ju Jingyi (鞠婧祎), an idol singer
 Ju Feng (鞠枫; 1995-) is a Chinese footballer

居
 Ju Wenjun (居文君), a chess player

Chinese-language surnames
Multiple Chinese surnames